Esfandiar Zarnegar (born 24 May 1942) is an Iranian fencer. He competed in the individual and team épée events at the 1976 Summer Olympics.

References

External links
 

1942 births
Living people
Iranian male épée fencers
Olympic fencers of Iran
Fencers at the 1976 Summer Olympics
Asian Games gold medalists for Iran
Asian Games medalists in fencing
Fencers at the 1974 Asian Games
Medalists at the 1974 Asian Games
20th-century Iranian people
21st-century Iranian people